The men's tournament in volleyball at the 2015 European Games in Baku, Azerbaijan was the 1st edition of the event in a European Games. It was held at Baku Crystal Hall from 14 June to 28 June 2015.

Squads

Qualification

Pools composition
Teams were seeded following the Serpentine system according to their European ranking as of January 1, 2015.

Twelve qualified nations were drawn into two groups, each consisting of six teams. After a robin-round, the four highest-placed teams in each group advanced to a knock-out round to decide the medals.

Pool standing procedure
 Numbers of matches won
 Match points
 Sets ratio
 Points ratio
 Result of the last match between the tied teams

Match won 3–0 or 3–1: 3 match points for the winner, 0 match points for the loser
Match won 3–2: 2 match points for the winner, 1 match point for the loser

Preliminary round
All times are Azerbaijan Summer Time (UTC+05:00).

Pool A

|}

|}

Pool B

|}

|}

Final round
All times are Azerbaijan Summer Time (UTC+05:00).
The teams who rank 1st in each pool played against the teams who rank 4th in the other pool.
The 2nd place teams in pool A played against the 2nd or 3rd place teams in the pool B, determined by drawing of lots. The remaining teams played each other.

Quarterfinals

|}

Semifinals

|}

Third Place

|}

Final

|}

Final standings

Medalists

See also
Volleyball at the 2015 European Games – Women's tournament

References

External links
CEV official website

European Games
Men's